Ri Pae-Hun  is a North Korean footballer who plays as a defender.

References 

Living people
1985 births
North Korean footballers
North Korea international footballers
Association football defenders